Hikayat is a monthly Urdu digest that was founded by Inayatullah in 1970. Inayat Ullah was a former member of Sayyarah Digest's editorial team, but later he established his own digest.
Hikayat Digest publishes Indo-Pak war stories, hunting stories, historical fiction and crime & punishment stories. The digest also includes articles about sex education and general well being.

Books
The stories/articles published in Hikayat Digest have later been compiled into book form and published by Maktabae Daastan (private) Limited, Lahore. Some popular books are:
 BRB Behti Rahay Gi (1965 war story) ... By Inayatullah
 Aur Aik Butshikan Paida Hua (Historical fiction novel) ... By Inayatullah
 Khaki Wardi Lal Lahu (War story) ... By Inayatullah
 Char Dewari Ki Dunya (Social stories) ... By Inayatullah
 Pak Fazaia Ki Dastan e Shujaat (1965 Indo-Pak war stories) ... By Inayatullah
 Tahira (Novel) ... By Inayatullah
 Main Kisi Ki Beti Nahi (Novel) ... By Inayatullah
 Badar Se Batapur Tak (1965 war stories) ... By Inayatullah
 Hamari Shikast Ki Kahani (1971 war stories) ... By Inayatullah
 Ustani Aur Taxi Driver Novel (crime & punishment stories) ... By Inayatullah
 Dastaan Iman Faroshon Ki (Historical fiction) ... By Inayatullah

See also
 List of magazines in Pakistan

References

External links
 Hikayat Digest Facebook page

Magazines established in 1970
Literary magazines published in Pakistan
Monthly magazines published in Pakistan
Urdu-language magazines
Mass media in Lahore